Donald Cerrone (born March 29, 1983), known professionally by his nickname "Cowboy", is an American retired mixed martial artist, actor, and former professional kickboxer. He competed in the Lightweight and Welterweight division for the Ultimate Fighting Championship (UFC).

Background
Cerrone was born in Denver, Colorado and is of Irish and Italian descent. At a young age, Cerrone was diagnosed with attention deficit disorder but never received treatment for it. Growing up he was considered a troubled child. He would eventually start street fighting and would often end up in jail overnight. When Cerrone was about 16 his parents were fed up with his behavior and sent him off to go live with his paternal grandmother Jerry Cerrone. Donald claimed that Jerry took him in with open arms. She would sometimes bail Donald and his friends out of jail after they got into another fight and according to Cerrone himself that the next morning she would never bring up exactly what happened the night before, she would just repeat the phrase "you know what you did" and leave it at that.

Cerrone attended Air Academy High School, where he began professional bull riding. At the age of 20, Cerrone began training in kickboxing and then later Muay Thai. After winning a few kickboxing competitions, Cerrone pursued a career in mixed martial arts (MMA).

Mixed martial arts career
Cerrone began his career in Commerce City, Colorado at a gym called Freedom Fighters. In 2006, Cerrone began training with Jon Jones, Rashad Evans, Nathan Marquardt, Keith Jardine, Georges St-Pierre, Leonard Garcia, Tom Watson and other skilled MMA fighters at Greg Jackson's Submission Fighting Gaidojutsu school in Albuquerque, New Mexico.

World Extreme Cagefighting
Cerrone was signed to fight in the WEC. His first fight in the promotion was against Kenneth Alexander. Originally a win via submission in 56 seconds of the first round, the decision was changed to a no-contest when Cerrone tested positive hydrochlorothiazide, a banned diuretic.

Cerrone was scheduled to face Rich Crunkilton at WEC 34, but Crunkilton was forced off the card with an injury and replaced by Danny Castillo. Cerrone won the bout via armbar in the first round.

Cerrone then faced Rob McCullough at WEC 36 on November 5, 2008. He won the bout via unanimous decision. The performance earned both fighters the Fight of the Night award.

On January 25, 2009, at WEC 38 he fought WEC Lightweight Champion, Jamie Varner, losing via technical split decision. The fight was highly competitive and won the Fight of the Night award. However, the fight was stopped prematurely in the fifth round when Cerrone hit Varner's temple with an illegal knee while Varner was still on the ground. Varner was given time to recover, but he was unable to continue, noting that he had double vision and had sustained a broken hand.

Cerrone was again scheduled to face Rich Crunkilton on June 7, 2009, at WEC 41, but Crunkilton was forced off the card with an injury and replaced by James Krause. Cerrone defeated Krause via first round submission.

Cerrone and Varner had agreed to a rematch, tentatively at WEC 43, but Varner was unable to receive medical clearance as a result from his hand injury. Cerrone fought Benson Henderson for the WEC Interim Lightweight Championship on October 10, 2009, at WEC 43 in San Antonio, Texas, losing by unanimous decision. Both fighters were awarded the Fight of the Night bonus award. Cerrone credited Henderson for being "a hell of a fighter" and conceded that he was slow to start the action, which may have cost him the match.

Cerrone faced Ed Ratcliff on December 19, 2009, in the event headliner at WEC 45.  Cerrone defeated Ratcliff via third round submission. The bout also earned Cerrone Fight of the Night honors.

Cerrone fought Benson Henderson in a rematch of their 2009 Fight of the Year, this time for the WEC Lightweight Championship on April 24, 2010, at WEC 48. Cerrone lost via first-round guillotine choke submission.

Cerrone faced rival Jamie Varner in their highly anticipated rematch on September 30, 2010, at WEC 51. He won the fight via unanimous decision, winning all three rounds. In between rounds, there were often many shoves and obscenities exchanged by both fighters, including a shove at the very end of the match. In the post-fight interview, Cerrone declared he'd be willing to do a rematch in Arizona, Varner's home state, to settle their score once and for all. The bout won Fight of the Night honors.

Cerrone instead faced Chris Horodecki on December 16, 2010, at WEC 53. He won via submission in the second round with a triangle choke.

Ultimate Fighting Championship
In October 2010, World Extreme Cagefighting merged with the Ultimate Fighting Championship. As part of the merger, all WEC fighters were transferred to the UFC.

Cerrone faced Paul Kelly on February 5, 2011, at UFC 126, replacing an injured Sam Stout. Cerrone defeated Kelly via tapout due to a rear naked choke. For their performance, both fighters earned Fight of the Night honors.

Cerrone was expected to face Mac Danzig on June 11, 2011, at UFC 131. However, Danzig was forced out of the bout with a chest injury and replaced by promotional newcomer Vagner Rocha.  Cerrone won the fight via unanimous decision.

Cerrone was expected to face Paul Taylor on August 14, 2011, at UFC on Versus 5, replacing an injured John Makdessi. However, Taylor was forced out of the bout with a foot injury and replaced by Charles Oliveira. Cerrone won the fight via TKO three minutes into the opening round, earning Knockout of Night honors for the performance.

Cerrone faced Dennis Siver on October 29, 2011, at UFC 137, replacing Sam Stout. Cerrone defeated Siver via first round submission, earning Submission of the Night honors.

Cerrone next faced Nate Diaz at UFC 141 on December 30, 2011. He lost the back-and-forth fight via unanimous decision, in a performance that earned both participants Fight of the Night honors. Despite knocking Diaz off of his feet multiple times with leg kicks, Cerrone could not offset the volume punches from Diaz, as Diaz landed 82% of the strikes he threw en route to his victory over Cerrone.  On his loss to Diaz Cerrone stated, "You know instinct, I think that's the thing a lot of people aren't doing. That's where I made the mistake in my last fight, is, you need to learn to turn your brain off and just go by reactions. Don't go in there and try and think and do things and fight with your brain, because that's the thing, I got angry and tried to kill him, and when you try to go [too] hard you just can't do it."

Cerrone was expected to face Yves Edwards on May 15, 2012, at UFC on Fuel TV: The Korean Zombie vs. Poirier. However, Edwards was forced from the bout with an injury and replaced by Jeremy Stephens. Cerrone defeated Stephens by unanimous decision.

Cerrone fought Melvin Guillard on August 11, 2012, at UFC 150. He won the fight via knockout in the first round. The performance earned Cerrone Knockout of the Night and Fight of the Night honors.

Cerrone faced Anthony Pettis on January 26, 2013, at UFC on Fox 6. Pettis won the fight by TKO in the first round, finishing Cerrone with a kick to the body. This marked the first time in his career that Cerrone lost via strikes.

Cerrone next faced Strikeforce veteran K. J. Noons on May 25, 2013, at UFC 160. He won the fight via unanimous decision.

Cerrone faced Rafael dos Anjos on August 28, 2013, at UFC Fight Night 27. Cerrone lost the fight by unanimous decision.

Cerrone faced Evan Dunham on November 16, 2013, at UFC 167. Cerrone won the fight via triangle choke in the second round. The win also earned him his second Submission of the Night bonus award.

Cerrone faced Adriano Martins on January 25, 2014, at UFC on Fox 10. He won the fight by knockout due to a headkick in the first round. The win also earned Cerrone his third Knockout of the Night bonus award.

Cerrone faced Edson Barboza on April 19, 2014, at UFC on Fox 11. Cerrone dropped his opponent with a strong jab in the first and quickly secured the rear-naked choke submission for the win. The win also earned Cerrone his first Performance of the Night bonus award.

Cerrone faced Jim Miller on July 16, 2014, at UFC Fight Night 45. Cerrone defeated Miller via knockout in the second round due to a head kick and punches, becoming the first man to give Miller a professional knockout loss. The win also earned Cerrone his second Performance of the Night bonus award.

Cerrone was briefly linked to a bout with Khabib Nurmagomedov on September 27, 2014, at UFC 178.  However, the pairing was quickly scrapped after it was revealed that Nurmagomedov had suffered a knee injury that would sideline him indefinitely. Subsequently, Cerrone was matched with Bobby Green at the event.  In turn, Cerrone eventually faced former Bellator Lightweight Champion and UFC newcomer Eddie Alvarez in the co-main event of the card. Cerrone won the fight via unanimous decision.

Cerrone faced Myles Jury on January 3, 2015, at UFC 182.  Cerrone commented on his desire to fight him was due to his disdain over Jury's arrogant response after defeating Cerrone's former training partner, Diego Sanchez, in UFC 171. He won the fight by unanimous decision.

In an unprecedented move, Cerrone requested to face friend and WEC rival Benson Henderson just 15 days later at UFC Fight Night 59, replacing an injured Eddie Alvarez. Cerrone won the fight via a unanimous decision with all three judges scoring the fight 29–28. 12 of 14 media outlets scored the bout in favor of Henderson.

Cerrone was expected to face Khabib Nurmagomedov on May 23, 2015, at UFC 187. However, Nurmagomedov pulled out of the bout on April 30 due to a knee injury. He was replaced by John Makdessi.  Cerrone won the fight via TKO in the second round.

After winning eight fights in a row in under two years, Cerrone earned his first UFC lightweight title shot. He faced Rafael dos Anjos in the main event at UFC on Fox 17 on December 19, 2015. Cerrone lost the fight via TKO just 66 seconds into the first round.

Moving up to welterweight
Cerrone was expected to face Tim Means in a welterweight bout on February 21, 2016, at UFC Fight Night 83. However, Means was removed from the bout on February 3 and was replaced by Alex Oliveira. Cerrone won the fight via submission in the first round. He was also awarded a Performance of the Night bonus.

Cerrone next faced Patrick Côté on June 18, 2016, at UFC Fight Night 89. He won the fight via TKO in the third round and earned himself another Performance of the Night bonus.

Cerrone next faced Rick Story on August 20, 2016, at UFC 202. Cerrone won the fight via TKO in the second round and was awarded a Performance of the Night bonus.

On August 26, 2016, it was announced that Cerrone had signed a new, eight-fight contract with UFC.

Cerrone was briefly linked to a bout with Robbie Lawler on November 12, 2016, at UFC 205. However, Lawler turned down the fight and Cerrone was then  scheduled to face Kelvin Gastelum on the card. However, on the day of the weigh-ins, Gastelum did not make an attempt to formally weigh in as he was well over the 171 lbs limit for the fight and the bout was scrapped. Consequently, Cerrone was quickly rescheduled and faced Matt Brown the following month at UFC 206. Cerrone won the fight via knockout in the third round.

Cerrone faced Jorge Masvidal on January 28, 2017, in the co-main event at UFC on Fox 23. He lost the fight via TKO in the second round.

Cerrone was expected to face Robbie Lawler on July 8, 2017, at UFC 213. On June 28, reports began to circulate that Cerrone had sustained a minor injury which would force the fight to be postponed to UFC 214 taking place three weeks later. UFC President Dana White confirmed later the same day that Cerrone in fact had a staph infection and a pulled groin, and the plan is to reschedule the pairing to after UFC 214. However, the bout eventually took place at UFC 214. Cerrone lost the back-and-forth fight by a very close unanimous decision that many feel that Cerrone should have indeed won.

Cerrone faced Darren Till on October 21, 2017, in the main event at UFC Fight Night: Cowboy vs. Till. He lost the fight via TKO in the first round.

Cerrone faced Yancy Medeiros on February 18, 2018, at UFC Fight Night: Cowboy vs. Medeiros. He won the fight via technical knockout out in round one. With this win, Cerrone tied the UFC records for most finishes in the promotion with fourteen and most wins in the promotion with twenty.

On June 23, 2018, Cerrone faced  Leon Edwards at UFC Fight Night 132. He lost the fight via unanimous decision.

In the beginning of August 2018, it was revealed that he had parted ways with his long-time striking coach Brandon Gibson after the loss against Edwards. Appearing on Joe Rogan Experience on August 29, 2018, Cerrone launched on a tirade against his training camp Jackson-Wink and announced that he had parted ways with the team altogether.

Cerrone faced Mike Perry on November 10, 2018, at UFC Fight Night 139. He won the fight by submission due to an armbar in the first round, becoming the first fighter to finish Perry in MMA. His fight earned him the Performance of the Night award. With this win, Cerrone set the UFC records for most finishes in the promotion with fifteen and most wins in the promotion with twenty one (21).

Return to Lightweight
Cerrone faced Alexander Hernandez in a lightweight bout on January 19, 2019, at UFC Fight Night 143. He was successful in his return to Lightweight, winning the fight via TKO in the second round, after outstriking and outwrestling Hernandez throughout the fight. With this win, Cerrone extended his UFC records for most finishes with sixteen (and most wins with twenty-two). He also added another record to his legacy, becoming the fighter with the most fight bonuses at sixteen.

Cerrone faced Al Iaquinta on May 4, 2019, at UFC Fight Night: Iaquinta vs. Cowboy. He won the fight via unanimous decision. This fight earned him the Fight of the Night bonus award.

In a quick turnaround, Cerrone returned to the Octagon just 32 days after his last win and faced Tony Ferguson on June 8, 2019, at UFC 238. Cerrone lost the fight via technical knockout in between the second and third rounds after Cerrone blew his nose, causing his eye to swell shut and rendering him unable to continue. This fight earned him the Fight of the Night award.

Cerrone faced Justin Gaethje on September 14, 2019, at UFC Fight Night 158. He lost the fight via knockout out in round one.

Return to welterweight
As the first fight of his new six-fight contract, Cerrone headlined UFC 246 when he faced Conor McGregor on January 18, 2020, in a welterweight bout. He lost the fight via technical knockout in the first round.

Cerrone faced Anthony Pettis in a rematch on May 9, 2020, at UFC 249. He lost the fight via a controversial unanimous decision.

Cerrone faced Niko Price on September 19, 2020, at UFC Fight Night 178. Price was docked a point in round one for repeated eye pokes, and the fight would be declared a majority draw. However, it was later overturned to a no contest (NC) after Price tested positive for marijuana.

Cerrone was scheduled to face Diego Sanchez on May 8, 2021, at UFC on ESPN 24. However, Sanchez was removed from the fight on April 28 for undisclosed reasons and he was replaced by Alex Morono. He lost the fight via technical knockout in round one.

Cerrone was scheduled to face Joe Lauzon in a lightweight bout on April 30, 2022, at UFC Fight Night 208. The bout was moved to May 7, 2022, at UFC 274 for undisclosed reasons. Despite both competitors weighing in, the bout was canceled the day of the event due to Cerrone falling ill.  The pair was rescheduled to meet at UFC on ESPN 37 on June 18, 2022. The bout was yet again scrapped the day of this event due to Lauzon suffering from leg cramping.

Cerrone, as a replacement for Bobby Green, faced Jim Miller on July 2, 2022, at UFC 276. He lost the fight via guillotine choke submission in the second round and subsequently announced his retirement during the post-fight interview.

Professional grappling career
Cerrone competed against Rafael dos Anjos in the main event of Submission Underground 19 on December 20, 2022. The match went to EBI overtime and Cerrone won by armbar at 20 seconds of the first round.

On December 19, 2021, Cerrone competed in his first professional grappling match against Craig Jones under the Combat Jiu-Jitsu ruleset at the Featherweight edition of the CJJ World Championships. He tapped out after being put in a rear-naked choke by Jones a little over halfway into the regulation period.

On December 30, 2021, Cerrone competed in a grappling match against Joe Solecki at Fury Pro Grappling 3. Solecki submitted Cerrone with a rear-naked choke at 3:17 of their match.

Acting career
Cerrone has had small roles in film and television since 2017, including appearing in the 2020 Netflix film Spenser Confidential.

He aced in a starring role, opposite Gina Carano, in the 2022 Daily Wire film Terror on the Prairie.

Personal life
Cerrone and his wife Lindsay have three sons: Dacson Danger Cerrone, born June 29, 2018, Riot River Cerrone, born September 11, 2020, and a third was born in early January 2023.

Cerrone is good friends with It's Always Sunny in Philadelphia creator Rob McElhenney, who has trained at BMF Ranch, and Cerrone made an appearance alongside Paul Felder, Megan Olivi and Dana White in the season 12 episode "Wolf Cola: A Public Relations Nightmare."

BMF Ranch
In 2014, Cerrone established an MMA gym at his property in Edgewood, New Mexico to lower his training camp costs by hosting his training partners at the estate. Coaches like Brandon Gibson, Jafari Vanier, and Jonavin Webb are usually situated at the ranch with fighters like Lando Vannata, John Dodson and Leonard Garcia.

Controversies

Racism accusations 
In 2014, the UFC lightweight fighter Bobby Green accused Cerrone of making racist comments towards him and about black people, in a since deleted interview with journalist Ariel Helwani. Cerrone dismissed his claims, maintaining that if he were racist, he wouldn't "have three black guys living with [him]".

The UFC bantamweight champion Aljamain Sterling has come forward with similar allegations in 2016, detailing an altercation between him and Cerrone during UFC International Fight Week. According to Sterling, after Cerrone made a comment about his gold chain that made him feel "uncomfortable", he then used an "inappropriate word" in front of Sterling. While Sterling never specified what the word was, he strongly implied it had racial overtones. When he asked for an explanation, Cerrone allegedly started to threaten him, telling him that he'd "beat the fuck out of him" and "do what Caraway did to him", referring to Sterling's UFC bout earlier that year in which he suffered his first professional loss to Bryan Caraway.

Cerrone has been criticized for his casual online usage of the racial slur "nigga", including in a 2016 exchange on Instagram with his sparring partner Said Nurmagomedov, in which each one referred to the other as "my nigga".

Allegations of sexual harassment 
In an interview with Ariel Helwani, the UFC fighter Bobby Green accused Cerrone of sexually harassing his female fans at UFC Fan Expo signing in 2014 . According to Green, he groped and behaved inappropriately towards the women that came to take a photo with him.

In an interview with Sherdog, Cerrone denied these accusations. "That was two years ago, ya' know? Why didn't any of this come out? Why didn't a fan file a lawsuit or say, 'Yo, Cowboy is groping my wife,' c'mon." he said of the alleged incidents.

Homophobic and transphobic comments 
As part of his trash talk to describe Jamie Varner in a build up of their second fight at WEC 51 in 2010, Cerrone commented that Varner is "a fag" and that he hoped to kill him in the ring. After WEC officials publicly condemned his remarks, he apologized for the death threats on Twitter, but did not mention the slur usage in his apology.

Cerrone was widely criticized for his use of a homophobic slur to describe Daniel Cormier's performance against Anderson Silva at UFC 200 during a Q&A at UFC Fan Expo, where he was taking part in a panel covering the event along with CM Punk and Joe Gooden. When talking with CM Punk about the worst performances of that night, he criticized Cormier's wrestling-heavy game plan asking "How you going to give up weight and fight like a fag, man?".

After an immediate backlash, a UFC senior official told the MMA Junkie portal that the organization was "incredibly disappointed by Cerrone's comments" and will be meeting with him to discuss the severity of the situation. Cerrone reacted to the criticism with a since-deleted Instagram post, which showed a photo of him wearing a then-recently released UFC rainbow T-shirt in support of the LGBTQ community and in which he apologized for his choice of words.

While Jason Ellis was interviewing Cerrone on his radio show, he mentioned that he is bisexual and has had sexual relationships with men, which appeared to make Cerrone uncomfortable. During his appearance on an episode of The Joe Rogan Experience podcast some weeks later, Cerrone called Ellis "a faggot", adding that he had not wanted to say it to Ellis directly. Ellis voiced his disappointment with Cerrone's statements in an interview with outsports.com.

When discussing U.S. president Donald Trump's attempts to ban transgender people from serving in the US armed forces on an episode of The Fighter and the Kid podcast, Cerrone objected to the host, Brendan Schaub, using female pronouns to describe a trans woman, and stated: "I'm just saying, if you got a dick, you're a dude."

Hoelzer Reich sponsorship 
Until 2009, Cerrone was one of a number of MMA fighters sponsored by Hoelzer Reich, a t-shirt company that includes symbols such as the Iron Cross on its t-shirts, which detractors have stated is Nazi imagery. The brand was banned by the UFC in 2009.

Views on COVID-19 
During the UFC Fight Night: Covington vs. Woodley post-fight press conference, Cerrone was asked by a journalist on his views on the COVID-19 lockdown and safety measures. He revealed that he refused orders to wear a mask on national television because he "doesn't stand for that shit" and that he is a "true-gritted hard core American Republican".

Championships and accomplishments

Kickboxing
Dominion Warrior Inc
Dominion Warrior Muay Thai World Lightweight (-73.4 kg/162 lb) Championship (One time)
International Sport Karate Association
ISKA Amateur Colorado State Middleweight (-75 kg/165 lb) Oriental Championship (One time)
Kickdown Classic
KDC Amateur Welterweight Championship (One time)
S-1
2006 S-1 Muay Thai U.S. Lightweight (-73.4 kg/162 lb) Tournament Championship 270

Mixed martial arts
Ultimate Fighting Championship
Fight of the Night (Six times) 
Knockout of the Night (Three times) 
Submission of the Night (Two times) 
Performance of the Night (Seven times) 
Tied for second most wins in UFC history (23) (w. Andrei Arlovski) 
Tied for second most finishes in UFC history (16)  (w. Jim Miller)
Tied for most post-fight bonus awards in UFC history (18) (w. Charles Oliveira)
Third most bouts in UFC history (38) 
Second most wins in UFC Lightweight history (17)
Third most finishes in UFC Lightweight history (10)
Most knockdowns in UFC history (20)
World Extreme Cagefighting
Fight of the Night (Five times) vs. Rob McCullough, Jamie Varner (2), Benson Henderson, & Ed Ratcliff
Most Fight of the Night awards in WEC history (5)
Ring of Fire
 Ring of Fire Lightweight Champion (one time; former)
MMAFighting.com
2009 Fight of the Year vs. Benson Henderson on October 10
MMAJunkie.com
2014 January Knockout of the Month vs. Adriano Martins
2014 July Knockout of the Month vs. Jim Miller
2016 February Submission of the Month 
2018 November Submission of the Month 
Sherdog
2009 Fight of the Year vs. Benson Henderson on October 10
2008 Round of the Year vs. Rob McCullough on November 5; Round 1
Sports Illustrated
2009 Fight of the Year vs. Benson Henderson on October 10
World MMA Awards
2011 Breakthrough Fighter of the Year

Mixed martial arts record

|-
|Loss
|align=center|36–17 (2)
|Jim Miller
|Submission (guillotine choke)
|UFC 276
| 
|align=center|2
|align=center|1:32
|Las Vegas, Nevada, United States
|
|-
|Loss
|align=center|36–16 (2)
|Alex Morono
|TKO (punches)
|UFC on ESPN: Rodriguez vs. Waterson
|
|align=center|1
|align=center|4:40
|Las Vegas, Nevada, United States
|
|-
|NC
|align=center|36–15 (2)
|Niko Price 
|NC (overturned)
|UFC Fight Night: Covington vs. Woodley
|
|align=center|3
|align=center|5:00
|Las Vegas, Nevada, United States
|
|-
|Loss
|align=center|36–15 (1)
|Anthony Pettis
|Decision (unanimous)
|UFC 249
|
|align=center|3
|align=center|5:00
|Jacksonville, Florida, United States
|
|-
|Loss
|align=center|36–14 (1)
|Conor McGregor
|TKO (head kick and punches)
|UFC 246 
|
|align=center|1
|align=center|0:40
|Las Vegas, Nevada, United States
|
|-
|Loss
|align=center|36–13 (1)
|Justin Gaethje
|TKO (punches)
|UFC Fight Night: Cowboy vs. Gaethje 
|
|align=center|1
|align=center|4:18
|Vancouver, British Columbia, Canada
|
|-
|Loss
|align=center|36–12 (1)
|Tony Ferguson
|TKO (doctor stoppage)
|UFC 238 
|
|align=center|2
|align=center|5:00
|Chicago, Illinois, United States
|
|-
|Win
|align=center|36–11 (1)
|Al Iaquinta
|Decision (unanimous)
|UFC Fight Night: Iaquinta vs. Cowboy 
|
|align=center|5
|align=center|5:00
|Ottawa, Ontario, Canada
|
|-
|Win
|align=center|35–11 (1)
|Alexander Hernandez
|TKO (head kick and punches)
|UFC Fight Night: Cejudo vs. Dillashaw 
|
|align=center|2
|align=center|3:43
|Brooklyn, New York, United States
|
|-
|Win
|align=center|34–11 (1)
|Mike Perry
|Submission (armbar)
|UFC Fight Night: The Korean Zombie vs. Rodríguez 
|
|align=center|1
|align=center|4:46
|Denver, Colorado, United States
|
|- 
|Loss
|align=center|33–11 (1)
|Leon Edwards
|Decision (unanimous)
|UFC Fight Night: Cowboy vs. Edwards
|
|align=center|5
|align=center|5:00
|Kallang, Singapore
|
|-
|Win
|align=center|33–10 (1)
|Yancy Medeiros
|TKO (punches)
|UFC Fight Night: Cowboy vs. Medeiros 
|
|align=center|1
|align=center|4:58
|Austin, Texas, United States
|
|-
|Loss
|align=center|32–10 (1)
|Darren Till
|TKO (punches)  
|UFC Fight Night: Cowboy vs. Till
|
|align=center|1
|align=center|4:20
|Gdańsk, Poland
|
|-
|Loss
|align=center|32–9 (1)
|Robbie Lawler
|Decision (unanimous)
|UFC 214
|
|align=center|3
|align=center|5:00
|Anaheim, California, United States
|
|-
|Loss
|align=center|32–8 (1)
|Jorge Masvidal
|TKO (punches)
|UFC on Fox: Shevchenko vs. Peña
|
|align=center|2
|align=center|1:00
|Denver, Colorado, United States
|
|-
|Win
|align=center|32–7 (1)
|Matt Brown
|KO (head kick)
|UFC 206
|
|align=center|3
|align=center|0:44
|Toronto, Ontario, Canada
| 
|-
|Win
|align=center|31–7 (1)
|Rick Story
|TKO (head kick and punches)
|UFC 202 
|
|align=center|2
|align=center|2:02
|Las Vegas, Nevada, United States
|
|-
|Win
|align=center|30–7 (1)
|Patrick Côté
|TKO (punches)
|UFC Fight Night: MacDonald vs. Thompson
|
|align=center|3
|align=center|2:35
|Ottawa, Ontario, Canada
|
|-
|Win
|align=center|29–7 (1)
|Alex Oliveira
|Submission (triangle choke)
|UFC Fight Night: Cowboy vs. Cowboy
|
|align=center|1
|align=center|2:33
|Pittsburgh, Pennsylvania, United States
|
|-
|Loss
|align=center|28–7 (1)
|Rafael dos Anjos
|TKO (punches)
|UFC on Fox: dos Anjos vs. Cowboy 2
|
|align=center|1
|align=center|1:06
|Orlando, Florida, United States
|
|-
|Win
|align=center|28–6 (1)
|John Makdessi
||TKO (head kick)
|UFC 187
|
|align=center|2
|align=center|4:44
|Las Vegas, Nevada, United States
| 
|-
| Win
| align=center| 27–6 (1)
| Benson Henderson
| Decision (unanimous)
| UFC Fight Night: McGregor vs. Siver
| 
| align=center| 3
| align=center| 5:00
| Boston, Massachusetts, United States
| 
|-
| Win
| align=center| 26–6 (1)
| Myles Jury
| Decision (unanimous)
| UFC 182
| 
| align=center| 3
| align=center| 5:00
| Las Vegas, Nevada, United States
| 
|-
| Win
| align=center| 25–6 (1)
| Eddie Alvarez
| Decision (unanimous)
| UFC 178
| 
| align=center| 3
| align=center| 5:00
| Las Vegas, Nevada, United States
| 
|-
| Win
| align=center| 24–6 (1)
| Jim Miller
| KO (head kick and punches)
| UFC Fight Night: Cowboy vs. Miller
| 
| align=center| 2
| align=center| 3:31
| Atlantic City, New Jersey, United States
| 
|-
| Win
| align=center| 23–6 (1)
| Edson Barboza
| Submission (rear-naked choke)
| UFC on Fox: Werdum vs. Browne
| 
| align=center| 1
| align=center| 3:15
| Orlando, Florida, United States
| 
|-
| Win
| align=center| 22–6 (1)
| Adriano Martins
| KO (head kick)
| UFC on Fox: Henderson vs. Thomson
| 
| align=center| 1
| align=center| 4:40
| Chicago, Illinois, United States
| 
|-
| Win
| align=center| 21–6 (1)
| Evan Dunham
| Submission (triangle choke)
| UFC 167
| 
| align=center| 2
| align=center| 3:49
| Las Vegas, Nevada, United States
| 
|-
| Loss
| align=center| 20–6 (1)
| Rafael dos Anjos
| Decision (unanimous)
| UFC Fight Night: Condit vs. Kampmann 2
| 
| align=center| 3
| align=center| 5:00
| Indianapolis, Indiana, United States
| 
|-
| Win
| align=center| 20–5 (1)
| K.J. Noons
| Decision (unanimous)
| UFC 160
| 
| align=center| 3
| align=center| 5:00
| Las Vegas, Nevada, United States
| 
|-
| Loss
| align=center| 19–5 (1)
| Anthony Pettis
| KO (kick to the body)
| UFC on Fox: Johnson vs. Dodson
| 
| align=center| 1
| align=center| 2:35
| Chicago, Illinois, United States
| 
|-
| Win
| align=center| 19–4 (1)
| Melvin Guillard
| KO (head kick and punch)
| UFC 150
| 
| align=center| 1
| align=center| 1:16
| Denver, Colorado, United States
| 
|-
| Win
| align=center| 18–4 (1)
| Jeremy Stephens
| Decision (unanimous)
| UFC on Fuel TV: The Korean Zombie vs. Poirier
| 
| align=center| 3
| align=center| 5:00
| Fairfax, Virginia, United States
| 
|-
| Loss
| align=center| 17–4 (1)
| Nate Diaz
| Decision (unanimous)
| UFC 141
| 
| align=center| 3
| align=center| 5:00
| Las Vegas, Nevada, United States
| 
|-
| Win
| align=center| 17–3 (1)
| Dennis Siver
| Submission (rear-naked choke)
| UFC 137
| 
| align=center| 1
| align=center| 2:22
| Las Vegas, Nevada, United States
| 
|-
| Win
| align=center| 16–3 (1)
| Charles Oliveira
| TKO (punches)
| UFC Live: Hardy vs. Lytle
| 
| align=center| 1
| align=center| 3:01
| Milwaukee, Wisconsin, United States
| 
|-
| Win
| align=center| 15–3 (1)
| Vagner Rocha
| Decision (unanimous)
| UFC 131
| 
| align=center| 3
| align=center| 5:00
| Vancouver, British Columbia, Canada
| 
|-
| Win
| align=center| 14–3 (1)
| Paul Kelly
| Submission (rear-naked choke)
| UFC 126
| 
| align=center| 2
| align=center| 3:48
| Las Vegas, Nevada, United States
| 
|-
| Win
| align=center| 13–3 (1)
| Chris Horodecki
| Submission (triangle choke)
| WEC 53
| 
| align=center| 2
| align=center| 2:43
| Glendale, Arizona, United States
| 
|-
| Win
| align=center| 12–3 (1)
| Jamie Varner
| Decision (unanimous)
| WEC 51
| 
| align=center| 3
| align=center| 5:00
| Broomfield, Colorado, United States
| 
|-
| Loss
| align=center| 11–3 (1)
| Benson Henderson
| Submission (guillotine choke)
| WEC 48
| 
| align=center| 1
| align=center| 1:57
| Sacramento, California, United States
| 
|-
| Win
| align=center| 11–2 (1)
| Ed Ratcliff
| Submission (rear-naked choke)
| WEC 45
| 
| align=center| 3
| align=center| 3:47
| Las Vegas, Nevada, United States
| 
|-
| Loss
| align=center| 10–2 (1)
| Benson Henderson
| Decision (unanimous)
| WEC 43
| 
| align=center| 5
| align=center| 5:00
| San Antonio, Texas, United States
| 
|-
| Win
| align=center| 10–1 (1)
| James Krause
| Submission (rear-naked choke)
| WEC 41
| 
| align=center| 1
| align=center| 4:38
| Sacramento, California, United States
| 
|-
| Loss
| align=center| 9–1 (1)
| Jamie Varner
| Technical Decision (split)
| WEC 38
| 
| align=center| 5
| align=center| 3:10
| San Diego, California, United States
| 
|-
| Win
| align=center| 9–0 (1)
| Rob McCullough
| Decision (unanimous)
| WEC 36
| 
| align=center| 3
| align=center| 5:00
| Hollywood, Florida, United States
| 
|-
| Win
| align=center| 8–0 (1)
| Danny Castillo
| Submission (armbar)
| WEC 34
| 
| align=center| 1
| align=center| 1:30
| Sacramento, California, United States
| 
|-
| NC
| align=center| 7–0 (1) 
| Kenneth Alexander
| No Contest (overturned by NSAC)
| WEC 30
| 
| align=center| 1
| align=center| 0:56
| Las Vegas, Nevada, United States
| 
|-
| Win
| align=center| 7–0
| Yasunori Kanehara
| Submission (triangle choke)
| Greatest Common Multiple: Cage Force 3
| 
| align=center| 2
| align=center| 2:46
| Tokyo, Japan
| 
|-
| Win
| align=center| 6–0
| Anthony Njokuani
| Submission (triangle choke)
| Ring of Fire 29: Aftershock
| 
| align=center| 1
| align=center| 4:30
| Broomfield, Colorado, United States
| 
|-
| Win
| align=center| 5–0
| Ryan Roberts
| Submission (armbar)
| Ring of Fire 28: Evolution
| 
| align=center| 1
| align=center| 1:49
| Broomfield, Colorado, United States
| 
|-
| Win
| align=center| 4–0
| Jesse Brock
| Submission (triangle choke)
| Ring of Fire 26: Relentless
| 
| align=center| 1
| align=center| 1:35
| Castle Rock, Colorado, United States
| 
|-
| Win
| align=center| 3–0
| Craig Tennant
| Submission (armbar)
| Ring of Fire 24: Integrity
| 
| align=center| 1
| align=center| 1:26
| Castle Rock, Colorado, United States
| 
|-
| Win
| align=center| 2–0
| Cruz Chacon
| Submission (triangle choke)
| American Championship Fighting: Genesis
| 
| align=center| 2
| align=center| 2:25
| Denver, Colorado, United States
| 
|-
| Win
| align=center| 1–0
| Nate Mohr
| Submission (triangle choke)
| Ring of Fire 21: Full Blast
| 
| align=center| 1
| align=center| 1:42
| Castle Rock, Colorado, United States
| 
|-

Pay-per-view bouts

Muay Thai record (partial)

Professional boxing record

Filmography

Film

Television

See also 

 List of male mixed martial artists

References

External links 
 
 

1983 births
American male boxers
American male mixed martial artists
American people of Italian descent
American male kickboxers
American Muay Thai practitioners
American practitioners of Brazilian jiu-jitsu
American sportspeople in doping cases
Boxers from Colorado
Colorado Republicans
Doping cases in mixed martial arts
Kickboxers from Colorado
Lightweight mixed martial artists
Mixed martial artists utilizing Muay Thai
Mixed martial artists utilizing Gaidojutsu
Mixed martial artists utilizing boxing
Mixed martial artists utilizing Brazilian jiu-jitsu
Living people
Mixed martial artists from Colorado
People from El Paso County, Colorado
Middleweight boxers
Middleweight kickboxers
People awarded a black belt in Brazilian jiu-jitsu
Ultimate Fighting Championship male fighters